Liam's Map (foaled 14 March 2011) is an American Thoroughbred racehorse. Unraced as a juvenile, he won three of his four races in 2014 without being tested against top-class opposition. As a four-year-old he emerged as one of the best horses in North America with win in the Woodward Stakes and the Breeders' Cup Dirt Mile. He was retired at the end of the season with a record of six wins and two places in eight starts.

Background
Liam's Map is a gray horse bred in Kentucky by the Albaugh Family Stable. He was sired by the Breeders' Cup Juvenile winner Unbridled's Song from whom he inherited his gray color. Unbridled's Song's other major winners have included Zensational, Unrivaled Belle, Will Take Charge, Midshipman and Eight Belles. Liam's Map's dam Miss Macy Sue was a successful racemare who won eleven of her twenty-five races including the Grade III Winning Colors Stakes at Churchill Downs in 2007. She was descended from the champion sprinter Ta Wee who was a half sister to Dr Fager and to the broodmare Magic whose descendants included Unbridled.

As a yearling Liam's Map was consigned to the Keeneland sales and bought for $800,000 by St Elias Stables. He entered the ownership of Teresa Viola Racing Stables and was sent into training with Todd Pletcher.

Racing career

2014: three-year-old season
Liam's Map began his track career in a maiden race over seven furlongs on August 23 at Saratoga Race Course. Ridden as in all of his 2014 starts by John Velazquez he took the lead in the stretch but was overtaken in the closing stages and beaten two and a quarter lengths by the favored Three Alarm Fire. On September 26 the colt started favorite for a one-mile maiden at Belmont Park and opened his winning account as he took the lead in the stretch and drew away to come home nine and a half lengths clear of Point Hope. Liam's Map next appeared in a one-mile allowance race at Aqueduct Racetrack on November 16 and recorded another emphatic win, finishing eleven and a half lengths clear of his six opponents. On his final appearance of 2014, Liam's Map was matched against older horses in the Harlan's Holiday Stakes over eight and a half furlongs at Gulfstream Park on December 13 and started favorite ahead of Pants On Fire, a six-year-old who had won four Graded stakes races and finished third to Goldencents in the Breeders' Cup Dirt Mile. The colt took the lead exiting the backstretch and got the better of a sustained struggle with the four-year-old gelding Valid to win by half a length.

2015: four-year-old season
Liam's Map began his second season on June 19 at Belmont when he started odds-on favorite for an allowance race over one mile. Ridden by Javier Castellano he led from the start and won by one and a half lengths from the five-year-old gelding Confrontation, to whom he was conceding six pounds.

The colt was then moved up sharply in class for the Grade I Whitney Stakes over nine furlongs at Saratoga in August and started 5/1 fourth choice behind Tonalist, Honor Code and Lea. Ridden by Mike Smith, he led from the start and kicked four lengths clear in the straight but was caught in the final stride and beaten a neck by Honor Code. After the race Pletcher said "He ran unbelievably well, setting those fractions to start and being there to the end. He just couldn't hold off a really good horse".

On September 5 at Saratoga, Castellano resumed his partnership with Liam's Map when the colt started favorite for the Grade I Woodward Stakes. His main rivals appeared to be Effinex (Suburban Handicap), Wicked Strong, Protonico (Alysheba Stakes) and Coach Inge (Brooklyn Handicap). Liam's Map led from the start, drew away from his rivals in the straight and won easily by four and three quarter lengths from Coach Inge with Wicked Strong in third. Pletcher commented "I'm just happy to see him get that Grade I that he deserves so much... he has that style where he can get into a cruising speed and just keep carrying it... He just gets into that rhythm and he just runs horses off their feet".

At the Breeders' Cup meeting at Keeneland, Liam's Map's connections opted to miss a clash with American Pharoah in the Classic and instead contest the Breeders' Cup Dirt Mile on 30 October. Shortly before the race it was announced that an interest in the horse had been bought by Lane's End and that Liam's Map would be retired to the Versailles, Kentucky-based stud for the 2016 season. In the Dirt Mile, Liam's Map started 1/2 favourite against ten opponents headed by Lea, with the others including Red Vine, Wicked Strong, Bradester (Monmouth Cup), Tapiture (runner-up in the race in 2014), War Envoy (Britannia Stakes),  Mr Z (Ohio Derby) and Valid. Castellano tracked the leaders as Bradester set the pace before switching out to make his challenge in the straight. Liam's Map overtook Lea inside the final furlong and drew away to win by two and a half lengths. Lea took second, three and a quarter lengths ahead of Red Vine who was in turn three and a quarter lengths clear of Wicked Strong in fourth. Castellano explained that he had intended to lead from the start and had to change his tactics when the colt did not break as quickly as expected. He commented "In this game you have to have a Plan B. I think the key was patience. He waited behind horses and it was phenomenal. He showed great skill. He can run on the pace or off the pace. I had to fight a little to put him behind horses, but when he was in the clear, he exploded".

In the Eclipse Awards for 2015, finished runner-up to Honor Code in the poll for American Champion Older Dirt Male Horse receiving 95 votes to his rival's 126.

Stud career 
After Liam's Map's victory in the Breeders' Cup Mile, Lane's End Farm announced publicly that they had acquired the rights to stand him as a stallion, alongside Eclipse Award nominee Honor Code, beginning in 2016. His initial stud fee was set at $25,000.

Liam's Map's first winner came on July 21, 2019 when bay colt Basin won a six furlong maiden special weight at Saratoga. The colt is out of Appenzell, a daughter of Johannesburg, who also produced millionaire Rise Up by Rockport Harbor.

Basin would go on to become his sire's first graded stakes or stakes winner when he won the Grade I Hopeful Stakes at Saratoga. The Steve Asmussen-trained colt took the lead down the stretch and drew away to win by 6 1/2 lengths on a sloppy track.

Notable progeny

Liam's Map has sired four Grade One winners.

Pedigree

References

2011 racehorse births
Racehorses bred in Kentucky
Racehorses trained in the United States
Thoroughbred family 1-r
Breeders' Cup Dirt Mile winners